Bronowice Małe is a neighborhood (osiedle) of Krakow, part of the Bronowice district.

History
Since 1294 the location was recorded to be a property of St. Mary's Basilica, Kraków.  During 1934-1941 it was part of rural gmina  and was its administrative center.

People associated with Bronowice Małe
Rydel family; see Rydlówka manor house-museum
Lucjan Rydel (1870–1918), poet, playwright
 (1833–1895), professor, rector of the Jagiellonian University, Krakow
Anna Rydlówna (1884–1969), nurse, recipient of the Florence Nightingale Medal
, historian, chief of the Polish section of the European Network Remembrance and Solidarity
, literature historian, editor, author, museum curator, recipient of the Silver Medal for Merit to Culture – Gloria Artis
 (Perel Singer, Pepa Singer) (1881–1955), the prototype of Rachel from The Wedding, an influential 1901 play by Stanisław Wyspiański
Włodzimierz Tetmajer  (1861–1923), artist and writer

References

External links

Bronowice Małe community (no-governmental) historical archive

Districts of Kraków